Michael Freund may refer to:

 Michael Freund (historian) (1902–1972), German historian and professor at the University of Kiel
 Michael Freund (activist), founder and chairman of the Jewish organization Shavei Israel
 Michael Freund (equestrian) (* 1954), German carriage driver, multiple Four-in-Hand World Champion